Li Guoxu (born 11 April 1978) is a former Chinese footballer and current manager.

Club career
Li Guoxu started his career at Dalian Wanda.

In 1999, he left Dalian Wanda to join Chongqing Hongyan in the Chinese Jia B league.

In 2000, he moved to Shaanxi National Power.

In 2001, he returned to Chongqing and joined Chongqing Lifan. He scored 4 goals in the 8–1 victory against Công an in the Asian Cup Winners' Cup.

In March 2004, he joined Boca Juniors on a short loan. He suffered phalanx fracture, and did not have appearances. He returned to Chongqing in July 2004.

In 2007, he transferred to Chengdu Blades.

Managerial career
Following Li's retirement in 2009, he joined Dalian Aerbin as assistant coach. He also managed Dalian Aerbin's reserve team from 2012.

In 2017, Li was appointed as the reserve manager of Dalian Transcendence. He was promoted to first team manager during the season. In the 2018 season, he was officially appointed as manager   but was sacked soon due to poor performances.

In 2019, Li returned to the renamed Dalian Yifang as reserves manager, but left the team not long after Benitez's arrival.

Career statistics

Honours

Club
Dalian Wanda
Chinese Jia-A League: 1997, 1998
 Chinese Super Cup: 1997
Shaanxi National Power
Chinese Jia-B League: 2000

References 

1978 births
Living people
Chinese footballers
Footballers from Dalian
Dalian Shide F.C. players
Chongqing F.C. players
Chinese Super League players
Association football midfielders